In the First Round of CONCACAF, the 20 lowest-ranked teams played home-and-away matches to determine the 10 teams who would progress to the Second Round of competition.

Matches

Grenada won 8–1 on aggregate and advanced to the Second Round.

Bermuda won 20–0 on aggregate and advanced to the Second Round.

Haiti won 7–0 on aggregate and advanced to the Second Round.

St. Lucia won 10–0 on aggregate and advanced to the Second Round.

Cuba won 5–1 on aggregate and advanced to the Second Round.

Suriname won 10–2 on aggregate and advanced to the Second Round.

Netherlands Antilles won 3–2 on aggregate and advanced to the Second Round.

 

Dominica won 4–2 on aggregate and advanced to the Second Round.

Saint Kitts and Nevis won 11–0 on aggregate and advanced to the Second Round.

Dominican Republic won 6–0 on aggregate and advanced to the Second Round.

See also 

1
World Cup